Harpalus smaragdinus is a species of ground beetle native to the Palearctic.

Description
The species head is broad at the ocelli. Its mandibles are pointed, with a tiny basal swelling. The species is similar to Harpalus affinis, but has a gradually rounded nasale between teeth, smaller than in Harpalus serripes.

References

External links
Harpalus smaragdinus on Carabidae of Romania
Images of Harpalus smaragdinus on Coleoptera.org
Harpalus smaragdinus on Kharkov Naturalist
Harpalus smaragdinus on Meloidae.com
Harpalus smaragdinus

smaragdinus
Beetles of Asia
Beetles of Europe
Beetles described in 1812